William Eddy Carr (March 26, 1917 – April 2, 2006) was an American football coach.  He was the head football coach at Alma College located in Alma, Michigan.  He held that position for the 1963 and 1964 seasons. His coaching record at Alma was 4–13.

Head coaching record

References

1917 births
2006 deaths
Alma Scots football coaches
People from Alpena, Michigan